The Ministry of Health and Sanitation is the health ministry of Sierra Leone. , the Health Minister is Dr. Austin H. Demby. Their offices are located on the fourth floor of the Youyi Building, Brookfields, Freetown.

, the Ministry of Health and Sanitation is engaged in a campaign against the Ebola virus epidemic in West Africa, in which Sierra Leone was one of the most seriously affected countries.

See also 
 Health in Sierra Leone
 Ebola virus epidemic in Sierra Leone

References

External links 
 https://web.archive.org/web/20141016121354/http://health.gov.sl/

Medical and health organisations based in Sierra Leone
Health and Sanitation
Sierra Leone